In mathematics, the general linear group of degree n is the set of  invertible matrices, together with the operation of ordinary matrix multiplication. This forms a group, because the product of two invertible matrices is again invertible, and the inverse of an invertible matrix is invertible, with identity matrix as the identity element of the group. The group is so named because the columns (and also the rows) of an invertible matrix are linearly independent, hence the vectors/points they define are in general linear position, and matrices in the general linear group take points in general linear position to points in general linear position.

To be more precise, it is necessary to specify what kind of objects may appear in the entries of the matrix.

More generally, the general linear group of degree n over any field F (such as the complex numbers), or a ring R (such as the ring of integers), is the set of  invertible matrices with entries from F (or R), again with matrix multiplication as the group operation.

More generally still, the general linear group of a vector space GL(V) is the automorphism group, not necessarily written as matrices.

The special linear group, written  or SLn(F), is the subgroup of  consisting of matrices with a determinant of 1.

The group  and its subgroups are often called linear groups or matrix groups (the automorphism group GL(V) is a linear group but not a matrix group). These groups are important in the theory of group representations, and also arise in the study of spatial symmetries and symmetries of vector spaces in general, as well as the study of polynomials. The modular group may be realised as a quotient of the special linear group .

If , then the group  is not abelian.

General linear group of a vector space 

If V is a vector space over the field F, the general linear group of V, written GL(V) or Aut(V), is the group of all automorphisms of V, i.e. the set of all bijective linear transformations , together with functional composition as group operation. The isomorphism is not canonical; it depends on a choice of basis in V. Given a basis  of V and an automorphism T in GL(V), we have then for every basis vector ei that
 
for some constants aij in F; the matrix corresponding to T is then just the matrix with entries given by the aij.

In a similar way, for a commutative ring R the group  may be interpreted as the group of automorphisms of a free R-module M of rank n.

In terms of determinants 

Over a field F, a matrix is invertible if and only if its determinant is nonzero.

Over a commutative ring R, more care is needed: a matrix over R is invertible if and only if its determinant is a unit in R, that is, if its determinant is invertible in R. Therefore,  may be defined as the group of matrices whose determinants are units.

Over a non-commutative ring R, determinants are not at all well behaved. In this case,  may be defined as the unit group of the matrix ring .

As a Lie group

Real case 

The general linear group  over the field of real numbers is a real Lie group of dimension n2. To see this, note that the set of all  real matrices, Mn(R), forms a real vector space of dimension n2. The subset  consists of those matrices whose determinant is non-zero. The determinant is a polynomial map, and hence  is an open affine subvariety of Mn(R) (a non-empty open subset of Mn(R) in the Zariski topology), and therefore
a smooth manifold of the same dimension.

As a manifold,  is not connected but rather has two connected components: the matrices with positive determinant and the ones with negative determinant.

Complex case 

The general linear group over the field of complex numbers, is a complex Lie group of complex dimension n2. As a real Lie group (through realification) it has dimension 2n2. The set of all real matrices forms a real Lie subgroup. These correspond to the inclusions
GL(n, R) < GL(n, C) <  GL(2n, R),
Complex n-dimensional matrices can be characterized as real 2n-dimensional matrices that preserve a linear complex structure — concretely, that commute with a matrix J such that , where J corresponds to multiplying by the imaginary unit i.

The Lie algebra corresponding to  consists of all  complex matrices with the commutator serving as the Lie bracket.

Unlike the real case,  is connected. This follows, in part, since the multiplicative group of complex numbers C∗ is connected. The group manifold  is not compact; rather its maximal compact subgroup is the unitary group U(n). As for U(n), the group manifold  is not simply connected but has a fundamental group isomorphic to Z.

Over finite fields 

When p is prime,  is the outer automorphism group  of the group Z, and also the automorphism group, because Z is abelian, so the inner automorphism group is trivial.

 

This can be shown by counting the possible columns of the matrix: the first column can be anything but the zero vector; the second column can be anything but the multiples of the first column; and in general, the kth column can be any vector not in the linear span of the first  columns.

For example,  has order .

More generally, one can count points of Grassmannian over F: in other words the number of subspaces of a given dimension k. This requires only finding the order of the stabilizer subgroup of one such subspace and dividing into the formula just given, by the orbit-stabilizer theorem.

These formulas are connected to the Schubert decomposition of the Grassmannian, and are q-analogs of the Betti numbers of complex Grassmannians. This was one of the clues leading to the Weil conjectures.

Note that in the limit  the order of  goes to 0! – but under the correct procedure (dividing by ) we see that it is the order of the symmetric group (See Lorscheid's article) – in the philosophy of the field with one element, one thus interprets the symmetric group as the general linear group over the field with one element: .

History 
The general linear group over a prime field, was constructed and its order computed by Évariste Galois in 1832, in his last letter (to Chevalier) and second (of three) attached manuscripts, which he used in the context of studying the Galois group of the general equation of order pν.

Special linear group 

The special linear group, is the group of all matrices with determinant 1. They are special in that they lie on a subvariety – they satisfy a polynomial equation (as the determinant is a polynomial in the entries).

If we write F× for the multiplicative group of F (excluding 0), then the determinant is a group homomorphism
det: GL(n, F) → F×.
that is surjective and its kernel is the special linear group. Therefore, by the first isomorphism theorem,  is isomorphic to F×. In fact,  can be written as a semidirect product:
GL(n, F) = SL(n, F) ⋊ F×

The special linear group is also the derived group (also known as commutator subgroup) of the GL(n, F) (for a field or a division ring F) provided that  or k is not the field with two elements.

The Lie algebra of  consists of all  matrices over F with vanishing trace. The Lie bracket is given by the commutator.

The special linear group  can be characterized as the group of volume and orientation-preserving linear transformations of Rn.

Other subgroups

Diagonal subgroups 

The set of all invertible diagonal matrices forms a subgroup of  isomorphic to (F×)n. In fields like R and C, these correspond to rescaling the space; the so-called dilations and contractions.

A scalar matrix is a diagonal matrix which is a constant times the identity matrix. The set of all nonzero scalar matrices forms a subgroup of  isomorphic to F×. In particular, it is a normal, abelian subgroup.

Classical groups 

The so-called classical groups are subgroups of GL(V) which preserve some sort of bilinear form on a vector space V. These include the
 orthogonal group, O(V), which preserves a non-degenerate quadratic form on V,
 symplectic group, Sp(V), which preserves a symplectic form on V (a non-degenerate alternating form),
 unitary group, U(V), which, when , preserves a non-degenerate hermitian form on V.
These groups provide important examples of Lie groups.

Related groups and monoids

Projective linear group 

Affine group 

It can be written as a semidirect product:
Aff(n, F) = GL(n, F) ⋉ Fn
where  acts on Fn in the natural manner. The affine group can be viewed as the group of all affine transformations of the affine space underlying the vector space Fn.

One has analogous constructions for other subgroups of the general linear group: for instance, the special affine group is the subgroup defined by the semidirect product, and the Poincaré group is the affine group associated to the Lorentz group, .

General semilinear group 

The general semilinear group  is the group of all invertible semilinear transformations, and contains GL. A semilinear transformation is a transformation which is linear “up to a twist”, meaning “up to a field automorphism under scalar multiplication”. It can be written as a semidirect product:
ΓL(n, F) = Gal(F) ⋉ GL(n, F)

Full linear monoid 

If one removes the restriction of the determinant being non-zero, the resulting algebraic structure is a monoid, usually called the full linear monoid, but occasionally also full linear semigroup, general linear monoid etc. It is actually a regular semigroup.

Infinite general linear group 
The infinite general linear group or stable general linear group is the direct limit of the inclusions  as the upper left block matrix.

It is used in algebraic K-theory to define K1, and over the reals has a well-understood topology, thanks to Bott periodicity.

It should not be confused with the space of (bounded) invertible operators on a Hilbert space, which is a larger group, and topologically much simpler, namely contractible – see Kuiper's theorem.

See also 
 List of finite simple groups
 SL2(R)
 Representation theory of SL2(R)
 Representations of classical Lie groups

Notes

References

External links 

 "GL(2, p) and GL(3, 3) Acting on Points" by Ed Pegg, Jr., Wolfram Demonstrations Project, 2007.

Abstract algebra
Linear algebra
Lie groups
Linear algebraic groups